Rome is an unincorporated community in Smith County, Tennessee, United States.

Rome is located at the confluence of Round Lick Creek and the Cumberland River. It is served by U.S. Highway 70N (US 70N).

Notes

Unincorporated communities in Smith County, Tennessee
Unincorporated communities in Tennessee